William Henry Sears (September 1, 1830 - February 7, 1891) was a Republican politician from California who served in the California State Assembly from the 21st district between 1861 and 1865, serving as Speaker of the Assembly between 1863 and 1864. He later served in the California State Senate between 1879 and 1881  from the 15th district where he was a candidate for President pro-tempore of the Senate but lost. He died in San Francisco in 1891 at the age of 60 and was buried in Mountain View Cemetery in Oakland.

References 

1830 births
1891 deaths
Speakers of the California State Assembly